Stu Dunbar (born 5 February 1996) is an Australian rugby union player who plays for the  in the Super Rugby competition.  His position of choice is fly-half.

Dunbar played for Sydney University before going to Europe and spending a season with Italian club, Verona Rugby, in 2016. He made his international sevens debut for Australia at the 2020 USA Sevens.

In 2022, He was part of the Australian team that won the London Sevens. They went on to win the 2021–22 World Rugby Sevens Series title. A month later he competed at the Oceania Sevens Championship in New Zealand. He was then selected for the Australian squad for the Rugby World Cup Sevens in Cape Town.

Super Rugby statistics

References

Australian rugby union players
1996 births
Living people
Rugby union fly-halves
Sydney Stars players
Melbourne Rebels players
Australian rugby sevens players
Greater Sydney Rams players